Tomoaki Taniguchi (谷口　智昭　Taniguchi Tomoaki born August 26, 1982, in Hyogo prefecture) is a Japanese rugby player who plays at lock for Toyota Verblitz and Japan. He scored two tries after coming on in the second half for Japan against Australia A on June 8, 2008 (2008 IRB Pacific Nations Cup Round One). He graduated from Ritsumeikan University

External links
 Tomoaki Taniguchi on Toyota Verblitz website
ESPN Scrum Profile

1982 births
Living people
Japanese rugby union players
Rugby union locks
Japan international rugby union players
Toyota Verblitz players